A sawmill is a machine, building or company used for cutting (milling) lumber.

Sawmill or Saw Mill may also refer to:

Sawmill (software), for statistical analysis and reporting of log files
Sawmill, Arizona, a census-designated place in Apache County
Sawmill, Gila County, Arizona, a populated place in Gila County
Sawmill Mountain, in California
Saw Mill River Parkway, in Westchester County, New York
The Sawmill, a 1922 film starring Oliver Hardy

Streams
Sawmill Brook (New Jersey), a tributary of Lawrence Brook
Saw Mill River, a New York tributary of the Hudson River
Saw Mill Run, a Pennsylvania tributary of the Ohio River

See also

Sawmills (disambiguation)